The Harumi Route, signed as Route 10, is one of the routes of the Shuto Expressway system in the Greater Tokyo Area.

History
The expressway between Shinonome and Toyosu opened to traffic on 11 February 2009, and currently consists of a single lane in each direction. A 1.2 km-long extension from Toyosu to Harumi opened on 10 March 2018.

List of interchanges and features

See also

References

External links

10
2009 establishments in Japan
Roads in Tokyo